Maria Filotti (9 October 1883, Batogu, Brăila County, Romania – 5 November 1956, Bucharest, Romania) was a Romanian actress . She was described as one of the "prestigious actors of the great realistic school" and the "directress" of a theater "that made an important contribution to transmitting the experience from one generation to the next."

Filotti was the grandmother of Romanian actor, Şerban Cantacuzino. Cantacuzino made his acting debut opposite Filotti in The Prince and the Pauper at the Bucharest National Theatre when he was eleven years old.

Legacy
The Maria Filotti Theatre in Brăila is named for Filotti.

Stage appearances
 Gioconda in "La Gioconda" by Gabriele D'Annunzio (1904–1905)
 Silvia in "Suprema forţă" de Haralamb Lecca (1904–1905)
 Nenela in "Come le foglie" de Giuseppe Giacosa (1905–1906)
 Enriqueta in "El loco Dios" de José Echegaray (1905–1906)
 Catherine de Septmonts  in "L'étrangère" by Alexandre Dumas fils (1906–1907, Iaşi)
 Berta in "Victims of the Law" by Landray (1906–1907, Iaşi)
 Clara Tardini in "Jucătorii de cărţi"  by Haralamb Lecca (1906–1907, Iaşi)
 Henriette in "Cele două orfeline"  de Adolphe d'Ennery and Eugène Cormon (1906–1907, Iaşi)
 Germaine Lechat in "Business is business (Les affaires sont les affaires)" by Octave Mirbeau (1906–1907, Iaşi)
 Nelly Rozier in "Nelly Rozier" by Maurice Hennequin and Paul Bilhaud (1906–1907, Iaşi)
 Thomry in "La Martyre" by Jean Richepin (1906–1907, Iaşi)
 Elena de Bréchebel in "La rafale (Whirlwind)" by Henri Bernstein (1906–1907, Iaşi))
 Elissa in "Rahab" by Rudolf von Gottschall (1906–1907, Iaşi))
 Lady Milford in "Kabale und Liebe (Intrigue and Love)" by Friedrich Schiller (1906–1907)
 Maria in "Magda (Heimat)" by Hermann Sudermann (1906–1907)
 Toinetta in "Eva" by Richard Voss (1906–1907)
 Neera in "Fântâna Blanduziei" by Vasile Alecsandri (1907–1908, Bucharest)
 Vidra in "Răzvan şi Vidra" by Bogdan Petriceicu Hasdeu (1907–1908)
 Eglea in "Dragoste cu toane" by J. W. Goethe (1907–1908)
 Corina in "Ovidiu" by Vasile Alecsandri (1907–1908)
 Zoe in "O scrisoare pierdută" by Ion Luca Caragiale (1922–1923)
 Countess Almaviva in "Nunta lui Figaro" de Beaumarchais (1922–1923)
 Hedda Gabler in "Hedda Gabler" by Henrik Ibsen
 Queen Elisabeth in "Maria Stuart (Mary Stuart)" by Friedrich Schiller (1923–1924)
 Irina in "Chaika (The Seagull)"  by Anton Chekhov (1923–1924)
 Clotilde in "Pariziana" by Henry Becque (1929)
 Zoe in "Gaiţele" de Alexandru Kiriţescu (1949–1950, Bucharest)
 Melania in "Yegor Bulychov and Others" by Maxim Gorki (1950–1951, Bucharest)
 Adela in "Citadela sfărâmată" by Horia Lovinescu (1954–1955, Bucharest)

Filmography
 Înşir-te mărgărite (1912)
 Independenţa României (1912)
 On the Waves of Happiness (1920)
 Visul unui nopţi de iarnă (1946)
 Citadela sfărâmată (1956)

Works
 Maria Filotti - Am ales teatrul - Editura pentru literatură, 1961

See also
Filotti

References

1883 births
1956 deaths
20th-century Romanian actresses
Romanian people of Greek descent
People from Brăila County
Romanian stage actresses
Theatre owners